Austin Ernest Duncan-Jones (5 August 1908 – 2 April 1967) was a British philosopher, with a primary focus on meta-ethics.  He was Professor of Philosophy at the University of Birmingham from 1951 until his death. He was president of the Aristotelian Society for 1960-61.

Early life and education
Duncan-Jones was son of the Very Reverend Arthur Stuart Duncan-Jones, Dean of Chichester, and was educated at Gonville and Caius College, Cambridge.

Career
In 1934, Duncan-Jones was appointed assistant lecturer in philosophy at the University of Birmingham, becoming professor in 1951. "In both motivation and style", Duncan-Jones was influenced by G. E. Moore. One of Duncan-Jones's concerns was to endorse the method of analysis he considered characteristic of Cambridge philosophy at the time; with A. J. Ayer, he made his most important contribution in this vein with a paper for a symposium "Does Philosophy Analyse Common Sense?" at the Joint Session of the Aristotelian Society and the Mind Association in 1937.

He was the founding editor of Analysis (this being suggested to be "his most significant contribution to twentieth-century philosophy"), which he edited from 1933 to 1940, until the Second World War intervened, and restarted it in 1947, remaining editor until 1948, and president of the Mind Association in 1952. He was president of the Aristotelian Society for 1960-61.

Personal life
In 1933, Duncan-Jones married the literary scholar and playwright Elsie Elizabeth Phare. They had two children, Richard Duncan-Jones, a historian, and Katherine Duncan-Jones, a Shakespeare scholar. His widow gave his papers and correspondence- including letters from G. E. M. Anscombe, Gilbert Ryle, and Moritz Schlick- to the University of Birmingham Library.

Works
 Butler's moral philosophy, 1952

References 

 DUNCAN-JONES, Austin Ernest’, Who Was Who, A & C Black, 1920–2008; online edn, Oxford University Press, Dec 2007   accessed 19 Feb 2012 
 R. B. Braithwaite, 'Austin Duncan-Jones' Philosophical Writings', Analysis, Vol. 28, No. 3 (Jan., 1968), pp. 71–77

1908 births
1967 deaths
20th-century British philosophers
Presidents of the Aristotelian Society
Academics of the University of Birmingham